William Ian Miller (born March 30, 1946) is the Thomas G. Long Professor of Law at the University of Michigan. He is also Honorary Professor of History at the University of St. Andrews. His area of specialty is the sagas of medieval Iceland, but he also has written extensively on revenge and on various emotions, mostly self-attentional. He grew up in Green Bay, Wisconsin, received his BA from the University of Wisconsin in 1969; a Ph.D in English and a JD in law at Yale 1975, 1980.

Bibliography

 
Hrafnkel or the Ambiguities. Oxford University Press. 2017. ISBN 9780198793038

References

University of Michigan faculty
People from Green Bay, Wisconsin
University of Wisconsin–Madison alumni
Yale University alumni
1946 births
Living people